Vo Thanh Binh is a former Vietnamese politician who served as Secretary of the Provincial Party Committee of Ca Mau province.

See also 
 10th Central Committee of the Communist Party of Vietnam

References

Living people
20th-century births
21st-century Vietnamese politicians
People from Cà Mau Province
Year of birth missing (living people)
Place of birth missing (living people)
Members of the 10th Central Committee of the Communist Party of Vietnam